The Micro-Term ERGO-201 is a computer terminal produced in 1983 as part of the ERGO series of computers manufactured by Micro-Term Incorporated, located in St. Louis, MO.  It consists of a monitor and a keyboard.  The monitor contains the motherboard with a keyboard, printer, and auxiliary port.  The computer runs on a SGS Z8400 CPU, a clone of the Zilog Z80A CPU

The Micro-Term Ergo Series can emulate a variety of terminals but the most common terminal emulation is vt100.

See also
Computer terminal
Micro-Term Incorporated

References
https://www.iana.org/assignments/terminal-type-names
https://web.archive.org/web/20070507123912/http://mintaka.sdsu.edu/faculty/wfw/CLASSES/ASTR680/utexas.unix_beyond.html
Motherboard image

Character-oriented terminal